This article lists the largest electrical generating stations in the United States in terms of current installed electrical capacity. Non-renewable power stations are those that run on coal, fuel oils, nuclear, natural gas, oil shale and peat, while renewable power stations run on fuel sources such as biomass, geothermal heat, hydro, solar energy, solar heat, tides, waves and the wind.

As of 2020 the largest power generating facility is the Grand Coulee Dam in Washington. The facility generates power by utilizing 27 Francis turbines and 6 pump-generators, totalling the installed capacity to 6,809 MW. The largest power generating facility under construction is the Chokecherry and Sierra Madre Wind Energy Project in Wyoming, which will generate 2,500-3,000 MW when completed in 2026.

Largest power stations 
List of the electrical generating facilities in the United States with a current installed capacity of at least 1,500 MW.

Notes

Largest power stations under construction 
List of the electrical generating facilities under construction in the United States with an expected installed capacity of at least 1,500 MW.

Largest decommissioned power stations 
List of former electrical generating facilities in the United States that had an installed capacity of at least 1,500 MW at the time of their decommissioning. Facilities that permanently shut down all of their electricity generating units within five years are included.

See also
List of largest power stations in the world
List of power stations in the United States by type
List of coal-fired power stations in the US
List of natural gas-fired power stations in the United States

References

External links

Economy-related lists of superlatives
Power stations in the United States, largest
Power stations in the United States

Power stations in the United States, largest